A catchphrase is a phrase or expression that is popularized, usually through repeated use.

Catch phrase or catchphrase may also refer to:
Catch Phrase (game), a word guessing party game by Hasbro
Catch Phrase (U.S. game show)
Burgo's Catch Phrase, an Australian version of the above
Catchphrase (British game show), a long-running British game show based on the original American show listed above
 "Catch Phrase", a song by Neil Innes from the album Taking Off